Princess Auto is a Canadian retail chain specializing in farm, industrial, garage, hydraulics and surplus items.

Headquartered in Winnipeg, Manitoba, Princess Auto owns and operates 51 stores in ten provinces as of November 2022, along with three distribution centres (Winnipeg; Calgary, Alberta; and Milton, Ontario). Various items are sold under its "Powerfist" and "Pro.Point" brands.

History 
The business was founded in Winnipeg, Manitoba, in 1942 by Harvey Tallman, who bought an auto wrecking business and expanded into war surplus, and later, tools and equipment. The company went through a few name changes in its lifetime, beginning with Princess Auto Wrecking, changing to Princess Auto and Machinery, and finally, to Princess Auto Ltd. In 1977, Princess Auto became a retailer, with the first store opening in Edmonton, Alberta.

In 2015, a manufacturing division in Winnipeg was closed. Princess Auto also offers online sales, a national call centre, and mail order service.

Stores
As of November 2022, Princess Auto owns and operates 51 stores, along with three distribution centres (Winnipeg; Calgary, Alberta; and Milton, Ontario). Since the opening of its first Quebec store in Saint-Jérôme on 17 September 2019, it has had stores in every province.

In Quebec, the tagline on the storefronts is Des idées. Des outils. ("Ideas. Tools."). The French language has been added to the website and the complete catalog has also been translated and printed in French.

References

Hardware stores of Canada
Industrial supply companies
Privately held companies of Canada
Retail companies established in 1933
1933 establishments in Manitoba
Companies based in Winnipeg